The 51st Signal Battalion is a United States Army unit which is part of the 22d Corps Signal Brigade located at Joint Base Lewis–McChord, Washington. Its mission is to rapidly deploy worldwide to engineer, install, operate, maintain, and defend the LandWarNet in support of full spectrum operations. The unit was deployed as of January 2015, and 2019.

History

World War I
The 51st Signal Battalion was constituted on 1 July 1916 into the Regular Army as the 5th Telegraph Battalion, Signal Corps. The unit was later activated on 12 July 1917 at Monmouth Park, New Jersey. On 1 October 1917, the battalion was re-designated as the 55th Telegraph Battalion. Soon thereafter, the battalion deployed to France and joined the American Expeditionary Force. During World War I, the battalion participated in three campaigns – Lorraine 1918, St. Mihiel, and Meuse-Argonne.

In 1935, the battalion took part in the Pine Camp maneuvers, which at the time were the largest peacetime maneuvers ever.

World War II
The battalion returned to New York on 27 June 1919 and moved to Camp Vail, New Jersey. The battalion was re-designated on 18 March 1921, as the 51st Signal Battalion. On 5 August 1925, the battalion returned to Fort Monmouth, New Jersey and would remain there until after World War II.
The battalion received additional training at Fort A.P. Hill, Virginia, Camp Blanding, Florida, and Camp Stewart, Georgia. The battalion participated in the Louisiana Maneuvers prior to deploying for Europe. On 4 March 1943, the battalion headed to North Africa and staged and participated in the Invasion of Sicily, followed by a mission to provide communications support to forces arriving in Italy in October 1943. For its service in World War II, the battalion was credited with five campaigns and received the Meritorious Unit Commendation.

Korean War
On 1 March 1945, the unit was reorganized and redesignated as the 51st Operation Signal Battalion. Then again, on 8 September 1950, the unit became known as the 51st Signal Battalion, Corps. During the Korean War, the battalion supported I Corps in ten campaigns and received two Meritorious Unit Commendations and the Republic of Korea Presidential Unit Citation. The battalion remained in Korea after the hostilities as part of Eighth Army. After the Korean War cease fire, the battalion was reorganized and redesignated as the 51st Signal Battalion. The battalion remained in Korea until 16 March 1981 when it moved to Ludwigsburg, West Germany in support of VII Corps.

Gulf War
On November 8, 1990, the battalion was mobilized for immediate deployment to Saudi Arabia in support of Gulf War. For its participation, the battalion received three campaign streamers. On April 15, 1991, the unit returned to Germany. Three years later, on April 16, 1993, the 51st relocated, less personnel and equipment, to Fort Bragg, North Carolina and on October 1, 1993, the unit was re-designated the 51st Signal Battalion (Airborne) by reflagging an existing signal battalion on post.

With the transfer, less personnel and equipment, of the parent 35th Signal Brigade to Fort Gordon, GA, to reflag the existing 93d Signal Brigade in 2007, effectively inactivating the brigade on post and vastly reducing the number of Signal personnel within XVIII Airborne Corps, the 51st was closed out at Fort Bragg and the lineage was transferred to Fort Lewis, WA, as a non-Airborne unit, again as part of the "new" 35th Signal Brigade.

Reorganization to 22nd Signal Brigade
On 16 November 2021, the battalion became a subordinate unit of the 22nd Corps Signal Brigade.

Honors

Decorations
  Meritorious Unit Commendation (Army), Streamer embroidered EUROPEAN THEATER
 Meritorious Unit Commendation (Army), Streamer embroidered KOREA 1950-1951
 Meritorious Unit Commendation (Army), Streamer embroidered KOREA 1953-1954
 Meritorious Unit Commendation (Army), Streamer embroidered SOUTHWEST ASIA 2003-2004
 Meritorious Unit Commendation (Army), Streamer embroidered IRAQ 2005
 Meritorious Unit Commendation (Army), Streamer embroidered IRAQ 2008-2009
  Republic of Korea Presidential Unit Citation, Streamer embroidered KOREA 1950-1953
Company B additionally entitled to:
  Presidential Unit Citation (Army), Streamer embroidered IRAQ
 Meritorious Unit Commendation (Army), Streamer embroidered KOREA 1952

References

Further reading

051